Riccobono is a surname. Notable people with this surname include:

Eva Riccobono, Italian actress
Fifa Riccobono, Italian music executive
Rosario Riccobono, member of Sicilian mafia
 Salvatore Riccobono, Roman law scholar
Vincenzo Riccobono, Italian botanist specialising in cacti